Amerige Park is a public park and multi-purpose athletic facility located at 300 West Commonwealth Avenue in Fullerton, California.  It sits on the site of the former Fullerton High School.  It was named for the city founders, George and Edward Amerige. Amerige Park serves as the site of the Fullerton Community Center and Duane Winters Field.

Baseball Legacy

Minor League baseball
Amerige Park served as the spring training grounds for the Pacific Coast League in baseball's early years for teams such as the Hollywood Stars (1935–36; now known as the San Diego Padres), Portland Rainiers (1937–40), Sacramento Solons (1941–42; 1944), the Los Angeles Angels (1946-55; no relation to the Anaheim Angels) and the Dallas-Fort Worth Rangers (the 1960s as an L.A. Angels affiliate).  Also, hall of Famers Joe DiMaggio, Walter Johnson, and Satchel Paige are known to have played on the field.  

In 2011, the park was being considered for possible remodeling and expansion to accommodate a proposed move by the Fullerton Flyers professional baseball team. The team's owners in 2011, Western Sports & Entertainment, were never able to reach an agreement with the city of Fullerton and the Flyers never played at Amerige Park.

College baseball
Amerige park is the home of the Hope International University Royals (NAIA college located in Fullerton). In their second year of existence, HIU made the NAIA World Series in 2017.

The Cal State Fullerton Titans baseball team played some home games at Amerige Park during the 1992 college baseball season.

References

External links
 Amerige Park at the City of Fullerton's Parks & Recreation page
 Amerige Park at Ballpark Review website
 Amerige Park at Charlie's Ballparks website
 Amerige Park seen on Google Maps

Baseball venues in California
Cal State Fullerton Titans baseball
Defunct college baseball venues in the United States
Defunct minor league baseball venues
Sports venues in Fullerton, California